The women's team competition at the 2018 Asian Games in Jakarta, Indonesia was held from 23 August to 26 August at the Pondok Indah Golf & Country Club.

Schedule
All times are Western Indonesia Time (UTC+07:00)

Results

References

Results

External links
website

Golf at the 2018 Asian Games
2018 in women's golf